Herman’s World of Sporting Goods was a sporting goods retailer in the United States.  It was founded by Herman Steinlauf in 1916 as a music store. Founded in 1916 by Herman and Eddie Steinlauf as a music store in lower Manhattan.  The first store was at 110 Nassau Street, in Lower Manhattan.  Later, the chain expanded to East 42nd Street and East 34th Street, then to Paramus, New Jersey.  The chain kept growing as time went on, in the New York metropolitan area and later other areas. Herman's later became a sporting goods outlet and was sold as a four-store group in 1970 to W. R. Grace and Company Eddie Steinlauf's son Leonard expanded into a fourth store in Paramus, creating the first sporting goods superstore.  This drew the attention of conglomerate W.R. Grace, who made a play for the company.  Leonard Steinlauf fought the sale, citing his vision of creating a national chain of sporting goods superstores.  He believed that Herman's should stay a family company.  Herman Steinlauf and Leonard Steinlauf's sister pressured Leonard into selling his 25% of the company, a decision he would later regret. Leonard Steinlauf became Herman's CEO but lasted less than ten years under a strained relationship with W.R. Grace. 

In 1985, the Dee Corporation of the United Kingdom, unable to expand in the UK due to its extensive holdings, purchased Herman's. To expand the chain, the next year, Dee moved west with the acquisition of Salt Lake City-based M&H Sporting Goods, which operated 41 units under the Sunset Sports Centers and Wolfe's names in western states. By 1992, Herman's had 259 stores in 35 states.

In 1993, the company was sold to a group of investors, including the Taggert/Fasola Group, a New Jersey-based management company. Citing its excessive debt load from acquisitions, Taggert/Fasola immediately applied for Chapter 11 bankruptcy protection and announced it would concentrate on its Northeast region, closing or selling all of its stores west of Pennsylvania and south of Virginia. This came even though the company had profitable locations in other regions of the country, notably Minneapolis–Saint Paul and Chicago. Some units were sold to other retailers: a consortium of Gart Brothers, MC Sports, and Big 5 Sporting Goods purchased a package of 21 locations in Arizona, Washington, Idaho, Utah, and Illinois for integration into their own chains. Later, Herman's exited several ancillary markets in the Northeast, notably Buffalo and Pittsburgh. While in Chapter 11 reorganization, the financial health of the chain improved, including the acquisition of the 17-unit Gold Medal chain in the Philadelphia area; 12 stores were retained in the Herman's system. It emerged from Chapter 11 in September 1994 with 103 units along the Northeast Corridor.

However, the revitalized chain soon found itself in financial difficulty again. 1995 was an "extremely difficult" year for the company as competition intensified, causing a cash shortage that led to vendors being slow to deliver product to the firm's stores. On April 26, 1996, it filed for Chapter 11 again. An analyst cited a crowded market, including such "category killers" as Sports Authority, as well as a harsh winter and recent strikes and lockouts in baseball and hockey for diminishing sales. It then proceeded to liquidate its stores. Regional competitor Modell's Sporting Goods acquired 16 stores in New York, New Jersey, and Pennsylvania.

Herman's main executive offices and warehouse were co-located in Carteret, New Jersey, at 2 Germak Drive. This building is now used by P.C. Richard & Son.

References

Retail companies established in 1916
Companies based in Middlesex County, New Jersey
Sporting goods retailers of the United States
Defunct retail companies of the United States
Defunct companies based in New Jersey
Retail companies disestablished in 1996
Companies that filed for Chapter 11 bankruptcy in 1993
Companies that filed for Chapter 11 bankruptcy in 1996